Macrolepiota subcitrophylla is a species of agaric fungus in the family Agaricaceae. Found in Yunnan and Hunan Provinces (China), it was described as new to science in 2012 by Zai-Wei Ge. It is closely related to the Australasian Macrolepiota clelandii, but can be distinguished from that species by its yellowish gills and smaller basidiospores, which measure 9.0–12.0 by 6.5–8.0 µm. The fruitbody of M. subcitrophylla has a whitish cap covered with brownish-yellow to reddish-brown scales. The ring on the stipe is loosely attached and becomes movable with age.

References

External links

Agaricaceae
Edible fungi
Fungi described in 2012
Fungi of China